The West End of London and Crystal Palace Railway (WELCPR) was an early railway company in south London between Crystal Palace station and Wandsworth, which was opened in 1856. The line was extended in 1858 to a station at Battersea Wharf near the bridge to Pimlico. Throughout its brief existence the railway was operated by the London Brighton and South Coast Railway (LB&SCR) to which it was leased in 1858 and sold in 1859. This relatively short line was of considerable importance to the history of railways of south London as it was the first line to create a corridor from the south and east towards Westminster and led to the development of London Victoria railway station.

History

Opening
To coincide with the reopening of the Crystal Palace at Sydenham Hill on 10 June 1854, the LB&SCR opened a short spur line linking a new Crystal Palace station to Sydenham station on the Brighton Main Line from London Bridge. The WELCPR was an independent company that aimed to create an additional line from Wandsworth to the LB&SCR station at Crystal Palace and thence to Norwood Junction, whence it would have running powers over the LB&SCR to East Croydon railway station. The line would also continue in an easterly direction towards Beckenham and Bromley. The intention was also to link the northern end of the railway to the London and South Western Railway at a point south east of Clapham Junction, whence trains would continue to Waterloo. The first part of the line, from New Wandsworth to Crystal Palace, opened 1 December 1856 and the extension to Norwood in 1857.

Stations
The original stations were:
New Wandsworth
Balham
Streatham Hill - the 1856 wooden station booking hall remains unchanged
West Norwood
Gipsy Hill
Crystal Palace Low Level.

The planned connection to the L&SWR never happened, and the railway continued parallel to the L&SWR line and then turned north to a station close to the River Thames at Battersea Wharf, misleadingly called Pimlico, which opened on 29 March 1858.

Operation
From the beginning the railway was operated by the LB&SCR in return for 42.5% of the gross receipts, less an annual fee of £8,000 to allow the LB&SCR to run its own trains over the line. Soon afterwards this line was leased to the LB&SCR.

Farnborough Extension
On 3 May 1858 the company opened the first stage of its projected Farnborough Extension to Shortlands railway station (then called Bromley) from Bromley Junction near Norwood Junction via Beckenham Junction station and a short-lived station at Penge (on the site of the present Beckenham Road tram stop).  This line connected with the East Kent Railway, which then obtained running powers over the WEL&CPR, providing it with an entry into London. In 1860, the East Kent changed its name to become the London, Chatham and Dover Railway (LC&DR). Passenger services between Crystal Palace and Shortlands were provided by the WELCPR, with a locomotive and stock bought from the LB&SCR from May 1858 to December 1860 and thereafter by the LC&DR.

The original WELCPR line from Pimlico to Norwood Junction via Crystal Palace was sold to the LB&SCR in 1859 and from Bromley Junction to Shortlands to the LC&DR, but were operated by the WELCPR until the opening of the LCDR line to Beckenham in 1860. The remainder of the Farnborough Extension was never constructed.

In 1860 the former WELCPR line at Pimlico was connected to the Victoria Station and Pimlico Railway, giving both the LB&SCR and the LC&DR access to the new Victoria terminus. Until 1863 this short section of line was a part of both the Brighton Main Line and the Chatham Main Line to Dover.

External links
 Beckenham History
 Kent Rail

References

Early British railway companies
Railway lines opened in 1856
History of rail transport in London